Haut-Nkam is a department of West Province in Cameroon. The department covers an area of 958 km and as of 2005 had a total population of 191,600. The capital of the department lies at Bafang.

Subdivisions
The department is divided administratively into 7 communes and in turn into villages.

Communes 
 Bana
 Bafang (urban)
 Bafang (rural)
 Bandja
 Banka
 Bakou
 Batcheu

References

Departments of Cameroon
West Region (Cameroon)